The Phycomycetaceae are a family of fungi in the order Mucorales. Species in this family are widespread, but more common in temperate areas. The family was circumscribed in 1982 by J. Arx.

Description
Members of this family have large, unbranched sporangiophores and zygospores with coiled tong-like suspensors bearing branched appendages.

References

External links
 
 

Fungus families
Zygomycota